National Highway 43 (NH 43) is a primary National Highway in India. It traverses from Gulganj in Madhya Pradesh, through Chhattisgarh and terminates at Chaibasa in Jharkhand. Before renumbering of national highways NH-6 was variously numbered as old national highways 78, 23 & 33.

Route

Madhya Pradesh 
Gulganj, Rajpua Amanganj, Pawai, Katni, Umaria, Shahdol, Anuppur, Kotma.

Chhattisgarh 
Manendragarh, Baikunthpur, Surajpur, Ambikapur, Pathalgaon, Jashpurnagar.

Jharkhand 
Gumla, Bero, Nagri, Ranchi, Bundu, Tamar, Chandil, Manikul, Saraikela, Chaibasa.

Junctions  

  Terminal near Gulganj.
  near Pawai.
  near Katni.
  near Shahdol.
  near Ambikapur.
  near Ambikapur.
  near Gumla.
  near Gumla.
  near Chandil.
  near Chaibasa.

See also 
List of National Highways in India by highway number

References

External links
NH 43 on OpenStreetMap

National highways in India
National Highways in Madhya Pradesh
National Highways in Chhattisgarh
National Highways in Jharkhand